Kajiri Kamui Kagura (かじりかむいかぐら or 神咒神威神楽) commonly abbreviated to K3 or KKK, is a Japanese eroge visual novel video game. It was originally released for Windows in September 2011, and was later remade for the PlayStation Vita. The Vita version, titled , was released on 25 April 2013, it removed all H-scenes from the original release, and added additional CGs.

The other two titles in the series are Dies irae and Paradise Lost.

Characters

Main characters

References

External links
 

 

Japan-exclusive video games gory:Video games developed in Japan]]
Cate    gory:Video games score isual novels
[[Categor